The 1922 Wyoming Cowboys football team was an American football team that represented the University of Wyoming as a member of the Rocky Mountain Conference (RMC) during the 1922 college football season. In their seventh season under head coach John Corbett, the Cowboys compiled a 1–8 record (1–7 against conference opponents), finishing in ninth place in the RMC. They were shut out in eight of nine games and were outscored by a total of 256 to 13. George Hegewald was the team captain.

Schedule

References

Wyoming
Wyoming Cowboys football seasons
Wyoming Cowboys football